Robert Kunkel (born 28 April 1999) is a German pair skater. With his skating partner, Annika Hocke, he is the 2023 European bronze medalist, 2022 Grand Prix de France bronze medalist, and has won three medals on the ISU Challenger Series, including gold at the 2022 CS Finlandia Trophy. Domestically they are the 2023 German national champions.

With his former skating partner, Talisa Thomalla, he competed at three World Junior Championships, placing twelfth in 2017, seventh in 2018, and twelfth in 2019.

Partnership with Hocke

2019–20 season
Kunkel formed a partnership with Annika Hocke shortly after the dissolution of her pairing with Ruben Blommaert.  Despite Hocke having previously attended the Olympics, the two were still age-eligible for international junior competitions, and so began on the Junior Grand Prix, where they won two bronze medals at JGP Croatia and JGP Poland, and were the only non-Russian team to qualify to the Junior Grand Prix Final, where they placed sixth.  On the senior level, Hocke/Kunkel debuted at the 2019 CS Warsaw Cup, placing sixth, and then won silver medals at the German nationals championships and the 2020 Bavarian Open.  They were seventh at the 2020 European Championships.

Hocke/Kunkel concluded the season at the 2020 World Junior Championships, where they placed fourth and won a small bronze medal for a third-place finish in the free skate; only Kunkel invalidating their pair spin element by putting both feet down kept them from winning the overall bronze medal.  Despite this, Hocke remarked, "our first and last Junior World Championships — it was amazing!" They had been scheduled to make their senior World Championship debut in Montreal, but the Championships were cancelled as a result of the coronavirus pandemic.

2020–21 season
With the pandemic continuing to affect events, Hocke/Kunkel made their season debut at the 2020 CS Nebelhorn Trophy, which featured only pairs training in Europe.  They were second in the short program, behind countrymen Hase/Seegert, who subsequently had to withdraw because of injury.  They were overtaken in the free skate by Italian team Ghilardi/Ambrosini and won the silver medal.

Hocke/Kunkel were scheduled to make their Grand Prix debut at the 2020 Internationaux de France, but the event was cancelled due to the pandemic.

Initially, both Hocke/Kunkel and Hase/Seegert were assigned to represent Germany at the 2021 World Championships in Stockholm, but Hase/Seegert were forced to withdraw after Hase sustained a leg injury, leaving Hocke/Kunkel as the lone representative. They placed thirteenth in their Worlds debut.

2021–22 season 
Hocke/Kunkel began the season at the 2021 CS Nebelhorn Trophy, where they placed fourth. Hocke said afterward she was pleased with their performance in light of multiple disruptions to their summer training caused by injury and illness. They went on to place eleventh at the 2021 CS Finlandia Trophy.

Initially assigned to the 2021 Cup of China on the Grand Prix, Hocke/Kunkel were reassigned to the 2021 Gran Premio d'Italia following the former event's cancellation. They placed eighth in the short program, and then withdrew due to medical reasons. In the new year, they finished thirteenth at the 2022 European Championships.

2022–23 season 
Before the season, Hocke/Kunkel relocated to Bergamo, Italy with Ondrej Hotarek, Franca Bianconi, and Rosanna Murante becoming their new coaches. They began the season with a bronze medal at the 2022 CS Nebelhorn Trophy and a gold medal at the 2022 CS Finlandia Trophy. Kunkel contracted COVID-19 shortly after the Finlandia Trophy, impeding their preparations for the Grand Prix, but they were able to compete at their first assignment, the 2022 Grand Prix de France. They won the bronze medal, their first Grand Prix medal, with Kunkel saying they were "very happy with the outcome."

On November 15, Hocke announced via her Instagram that she and Kunkel had withdrawn from the 2022 NHK Trophy due to Hocke testing positive for COVID-19 just prior to the event.

Hocke/Kunkel returned to competition at the German championships, winning their first national gold medal and an assignment to compete at the 2023 European Championships. With Russian pairs banned from competing due to the Russo-Ukrainian War, the podium was considered far more open than in prior years. Both made jump errors in the short program, but they finished second in the segment, winning a silver small medal. Third in the free skate, they dropped to third overall, winning the bronze medal.

Programs

With Hocke

With Thomalla

Competition results 
GP: Grand Prix; CS: ISU Challenger Series; JGP: Junior Grand Prix

Pairs with Hocke

Pairs with Thomalla

Men's singles

Detailed results 
Small medals for short and free programs awarded only at ISU Championships.

With Hocke

Senior results

Junior results

References

External links 
 
 

1999 births
German male pair skaters
Living people
Figure skaters from Berlin
20th-century German people
21st-century German people